The SS2 (short for) is a replacement for the Pindad SS1 created by PT Pindad. It had been seen during the ASEAN Army Rifles contest by foreign media in 2006 aside from exposure by local Indonesian media.

The SS2 assault rifles are currently being brought into service with the Indonesian military and police. They will gradually replace the SS1 assault rifles which have been in service with the security forces since the 1990s.

History
The SS2 was first ordered by the Indonesian military in 2002 and in 2003. It had then been announced that the rifle was launched in 2005 150 SS2-V4s were purchased in 2007. A SS2 with a solid stock, known as the SS2-V3 would have been produced by Pindad, but was rejected.

The Indonesian Army placed an order of 15,000 SS2s to replace their stock of SS1s back in 2005 with an additional order of 10,000 SS2s in 2006. Its first combat use was with Indonesian troops armed with SS2s in Aceh.

The SS2s were shown abroad in Malaysia during the Defences Services Asia Exhibition and Conference 2010.

Both Brunei and Iraq have expressed recent interest in purchasing SS2s for their militaries. Myanmar has expressed interest in purchasing SS2 rifles despite a statement from Indonesian Foreign Minister Marty Natalegawa that it was not true. Col. Jan Pieter Ate of the Indonesian Defense Ministry expressed his concerns that SS2 rifles can be used to threaten other countries and on civilians while University of Indonesia security analyst Andi Widjajanto said that selling the rifles to the country can help improve relations while allowing the black market to lose its presence there.

Pindad plans to market the weapon to third world countries such as the Congo, Iran and Uganda. On June 1, 2018, Pindad announced that it has entered into a partnership with Bhukhanvala Industries to market the SS2 to Indian military and law enforcement agencies.

Brunei announced in 2018 that plans to purchase the SS2 will finally push through after informal talks started in 2015.

According to Pindad representatives, around 40,000 SS2s are made annually. SS2 has a local content between 51.31% (SS2-V5 A1) to 78.04% (SS2-V5).

Design
The SS2 is an upgrade of the Pindad SS1, being a licensed version of the FN FNC. The SS2's flash suppressor is based on that of the Colt M16A2, and it has a reciprocating charging handle that can be used for forward assist, with the front sight being based on the AK rifles.

The carrying handle and detachable rear sight on top of the Picatinny rail can be removed in order to install various optics.

The rifle's front handguard is ribbed, with cuts for thermal ventilation. This design improves barrel cooling in situations where sustained fire is necessary. The SS2's barrels were originally produced in Germany before Pindad switched to South Korean-made barrels due to issues with an arms embargo at the time.

The charging handle is on the right side of the SS2 with the fire/safety selector on the left side with provision for single and full auto fire alongside safe mode. Upper and lower receivers are made from aluminium alloy and are connected via cross pins.

Variants

SS2-V1
A new rifle based on the SS1, being replaced in the Indonesian military after tests had been conducted from 2003 to 2005. It has been adopted by Indonesian security forces in 2006. It has a carrying handle that can be replaced with a scope for scope mounting on a Picatinny rail and a side-folding stock.

SS2-V1HB 
A sub-variant of the SS2-V1 with a heavy barrel.

SS2-V1 A1 
A sub-variant of the SS2-V1 with Picatinny rail handguard and fold-adjustable stock (optional), frequently seen side-folding stock.

SS2-V2
A carbine version of the SS2-V1.

SS2-V2HB 
A sub-variant of the SS2-V2 with a heavy barrel.

SS2-V2 A1 
A sub-variant of the SS2-V2 with new fold-adjustable stock, new pistol grip and Picatinny rail handguard.

SS2-V3
Instead of having the usual side-folding stock, the stock for the SS2-V3 was replaced with a fixed one for experimental purposes. The result was very unsatisfying, and so the project for SS2-V3 got abandoned and was never mass-produced.

SS2-V4

Carrying handle replaced with a Picatinny rail for scope mounting as a designated marksman rifle. Said to be for the use of Indonesian special forces. The front sight has been removed and the barrel lengthened and accurised to improve accuracy.

SS2-V4HB 
A sub-variant of the SS2-V4 with a heavy barrel, accurate out to 600 meters.

SS2-V5

A compact version of the SS2-V1. Unveiled at the Indo Defence & Aerospace exhibition in 2008.

SS2-V5 A1 

A sub-variant of the SS2-V5, with new picatinny rail handguard, new pistol grip and fold-adjustable stock. The V5 A1 use telescopic-based stocks.

These were publicly unveiled in 2012.

These are ordered for Mobile Brigade Corps (Brimob), Army Strategic Reserves Command (Kostrad) and also for Armed Forces Reserve Component (Komcad). The Army's 411th Mechanized Infantry Battalion received 67 SS2-V5 A1s in January 2021.

SS2-V5C
A sub-variant of the SS2-V5 with M4-style stock, these are ordered for Kopassus forces. These were publicly unveiled in 2012.

SS2-V7
Launched in May 2016, the SS2-V7 is a subsonic variant intended to be used in special forces operations when stealth is required through the use of a mounted suppressor. Due to security concerns, there are no plans to market it overseas. It was officially revealed to the press in a public event sponsored by the Indonesian Ministry of Defense on June 9, 2016.

It can be used for up to 150 meters. SS2-V7 uses its own subsonic round. According to Pindad, it's much quieter than the MP7 when fired. This variant equipped with an ACOG sight in the sales package.

DMR SPM-1

An Designated marksman rifle version. This rifle uses a gas acting system with a caliber of 5.56 x 45 mm NATO, and a barrel length of 500 mm. The DMR SPM-1 has a longer size, which is 1026 mm when the stock is stretched and 782 mm when the butt is folded.

SS3

A 7.62 mm version of the in-service Pindad SS2 assault rifle. Pindad designed the SS3 as a designated marksman rifle for use in assault teams that require a high level of accuracy. The SS3 was exhibited at Indo Defence 2016.

Users

: Standard issue for the Indonesian National Armed Forces. Over 25,000 SS2s have been purchased by the Indonesian Army as of 2006. Also used by the Komando Pasukan Katak (Kopaska) tactical diver group of the Indonesian Navy. Mobile Brigade Corps officers would acquire SS2-V5A1 assault rifles while Kopassus operators would be armed with SS2-V5Cs. Indonesian State Intelligence Agency ordered for 517 SS2s with the Indonesian National Police making an order for 5,000 SS2s. Additional 25,000 SS2-V5 A1 has been purchased in May 2021 for Komcad (Armed Forces Reserves Component).
: Used by Lao People's Armed Forces.

Potential users
: Brunei has announced plans to buy SS2 assault rifles under a memorandum of understanding signed between Brunei and PT Pindad. In 2018, Brunei agreed to proceed with purchases of the SS2.
: Iraq has some interest in obtaining SS2 rifles for its security forces with Iraqi and Indonesian officials having several meetings over possible plans on buying the rifles.
: Myanmar has expressed interest in acquiring SS2 rifles despite a previous statement from the Indonesian Foreign Minister that no such announcement was made public to Jakarta.
: In September 2016, Indonesia and Pakistan explored opportunities to offer each other defence equipment in a meeting between Wiranto and Rashad Mahmood. PT Pindad's Director of Technology and Development, Ade Bagdja would receive a Pakistani Delegation led by Rear Admiral Mirza Foad Amin Baig and expressed interest in a number of weapons including the SS2.
: To be locally produced in a joint effort with Continental Aviation Services. A Pindad-owned plant is set to be established in 2017.

Non-state users 

  Free Papua Movement
  East Indonesia Mujahideen

Criticism
According to someone who have fired the SS2 V2, among the major faults of the assault rifle include the lack of a good cheek piece support. The handgrip's shape is criticised for being too tubular, although it's being changed to accommodate picatinny railings. The recoil is criticised as being stronger than SS1: For rapid firing, a larger recoil will extend the target reacquisition time so that accuracy will decrease.

The SS2 V5 variants were created to address issues on using the SS2 V2/V4.

See also 
 Pindad SS1
 Komodo Armament D5

References

External links

 Official Site (Archive)

5.56×45mm NATO assault rifles
Carbines
Kalashnikov derivatives
Post–Cold War military equipment of Indonesia
Assault rifles of Indonesia
Military equipment introduced in the 2000s